The Nissan Diesel Space Arrow (kana:日産ディーゼル・スペースアロー) is a heavy-duty coach produced by the Japanese manufacturer Nissan Diesel from 1985 until 2010. The range was primarily available as tourist coach.

RA Series 
RA50 (1973)
K-RM51 (1980)
P-RA52 (1984)

Space Arrow RA/Space Wing I 
In 2005, Space Arrow RA/Space Wing I engine was changed to MD92TK. The MD92TK engine uses AdBlue Urea Selective Catalytic Reduction technology and ZF Ecomat 2 Plus 6-speed automatic equipped (6-speed manual deleted from lineup).

P-RA46/53 (1985)
U-RA520/530 (1990)
KC-RA531/550 (1995)
KL-RA552 (2000)
ADG-RA273 (2005)
PKG-RA274 (2006)

Space Arrow Euro Tour (1996-2001) 
The Space Arrow Euro Tour also called as "Euro Bus" is fitted with a Nissan Diesel Philippines body (based Jonckheere Deauville).
JA530RAN (RG8) (1996) - 350ps version
JA520RAN (RF8) - 310ps version

Space Arrow A/Space Wing A 
The Space Arrow A/Space Wing A is a rebadged Mitsubishi Fuso Aero Ace/Mitsubishi Fuso Aero Queen.
BKG-AS96JP (2007)
LKG-AS96VP (2010)

Model lineup 

Hi-decker
Space Arrow 12m
Super hi-decker
Space Wing 12m
Space Wing 3 axles 12m

Coaches (bus)
Space Arrow
UD trucks
Vehicles introduced in 1985
Tri-axle buses